The Skitube Alpine Railway is an Australian standard gauge electric rack railway in the Kosciuszko National Park in New South Wales. It provides access to the snowfields at Blue Cow Mountain and the Perisher Valley.

History
In the 1980s, development of the Thredbo and Perisher Valley skifields was increasing, but the mountain road providing access to them was limited. In 1980 the National Parks & Wildlife Service proposed the establishment of a day visitors resort at Blue Cow Mountain, which would increase the traffic demands. A number of transport modes were examined, including a funicular railway, chairlift, and an aerial gondola, but all were of limited capacity, affected by weather, and would scar the mountainsides.

A rack and pinion railway was found to be the best option, running mostly underground. The Perisher Skitube Joint Venture was established, with Transfield and Kumagai Gumi each holding a 49% share. The main proponent of the scheme, Canberra engineer Ken Bilston, held the remaining 2% share and was technical manager for the project. Feasibility studies commenced in 1982 for a double track railway on the assumption that the road would close in winter, but this was altered to a single track line with passing loops when the closure was ruled out.

Construction commenced in October 1984, with tunnelling beginning in June 1985. The 3.3 km Bilston Tunnel was constructed using a  tunnel boring machine, while the 2.6 kilometre Blue Cow tunnel was constructed using the traditional "drill and blast" method. A consortium of Swiss and Australian companies (SLM, BBC, and Comeng) provided the rolling stock, overhead wiring, sub-stations, communications and signalling. The 5.9 kilometre line opened from Bullocks Flat to Perisher on 26 July 1987 with the entire line opened through to Blue Cow on 31 March 1988.

In October 2016, Stadler Rail commenced an upgrade of the line. It was to be completed by April 2017.

Operations 

The Swiss-designed railway provides easy access between the Alpine Way at Bullocks Flat and the Perisher Blue ski resort sites of Perisher Valley and Blue Cow Mountain. The Skitube passes through two tunnels and has three stations, two of which are underground. The terminal at Bullocks Flat has parking facilities for 3,500 cars and 250 coaches, as well as passenger, administrative and control facilities.

The line begins at an elevation of 1,125 metres and runs above ground for 2.6 kilometres, crossing a three-span 150-metre-long steel truss bridge. A passing loop is located before entering the tunnel, which climbs on a 12.5% gradient to the Perisher Valley terminal. A provision for a second 300-metre-long passing loop has been made inside the tunnel. To Blue Cow the line first drops downgrade, then climbs 1.3 kilometres on a 3% gradient, then climbs at 12.5% to the terminus. The railway reaches a maximum elevation of 1,905 metres above sea level at Mount Blue Cow station.

An off-peak schedule is run in early to late June and mid to late September, either side of the peak July–September ski season. Trains run between 05:00 and 01:00, allowing for après-ski activities or night skiing. The Bullocks Flat terminus has a large, three-sided station with extensive parking, a pass office, a ski and snowboard school, information desk, kiosk, souvenir shop, and ski and snowboard hire shop. This allows day trippers to get tickets and equipment and be loaded for the 10-minute journey to the Perisher Valley station, and a further 7 minutes to Blue Cow. It is adjacent to the Lake Crackenback Resort.

Technical details 

Rolling stock 

To operate the service 11 carriages were built by Comeng, Granville and Fuji Heavy Industries. This provides for the movement of around 4,500 people per hour. Eleven passenger cars in total were built, 4 motor cars, 4 driving trailers and 3 non driving trailers. The motor cars each have four  traction motors, making them perhaps the most powerful rack railcars in the world. The braking system is mixed regenerative and rheostatic.

Two four-wheel 'S' open wagons were acquired from the State Rail Authority for freight traffic, and have been cut down to flat wagons.  A 1958 Tulloch Limited built locomotive was also purchased.

The trains of the Skitube operate on the Lamella rack system, which was developed by Von Roll Holding.

Stations 
Blue Cow
Bullocks Flat
Perisher Valley

References

External links 

Skitube information

Broadspectrum
Mountain railways
Rack railways in Australia
Railway lines opened in 1988
Regional railway lines in New South Wales
Snowy Mountains
Standard gauge railways in Australia
Tourist railways in New South Wales
1988 establishments in Australia